Dryornis (meaning "tree bird"), also called the Argentinian vulture, is an extinct genus of cathartid (New World vulture), known from Argentina. The genus contains two species, D. pampeanus and D. hatcheri.

Discovery and naming 

Dryornis was first described in 1891 by Argentine paleontologists Francisco Moreno and Alcides Mercerat, the type species being D. pampeanus, based on the distal portion of a right humerus and a right femur that was supposedly part of the same individual, though it has since been referred to the phorusrhacid Mesembriornis milneedwardsi. The fossils had been collected from the Pliocene age deposits of the Monte Hermoso Formation in Buenos Aires, Argentina and have since been deposited at the Museo de La Plata under specimen number MLP 20-169. Between 1896 and 1899, the American Princeton University dispatched several expeditions to the Miocene Santa Cruz Formation of Santa Cruz, Argentina to recover fossils of taxa previously described by paleontologists like Moreno, Mercerat, and Florentino Ameghino. These expeditions were led by notable fossil collector John Bell Hatcher, who in 1899, unearthed a fragmentary left humerus that was later referred to the “terror bird” Phorusrhacos in 1932. This humerus was deposited at the Yale Peabody Museum under catalogue number  . It remained unstudied until 2022, when Argentine paleontologist Federico J. Degrange noticed its true affinities and described it as a new species of Dryornis, D. hatcheri.

D. pampeanus was only known from the type specimen until a 2021 paper described an individual preserving a: right pectoral girdle, articulated partial right forelimb, incomplete right scapula, and fragments from the sternum and tibiotarsus. The paper also assigned an isolated distal left ulna and another specimen preserving an incomplete right ulna and proximal right radius fragment. All of the fossils had been collected from the La Estafeta Beach in Mar del Plata, Buenos Aires, Argentina and were from the Late Pliocene aged Chapadmalal Formation. The fossils allowed more detailed analysis of the species’ phylogeny and revealed many novel diagnostic characteristics for the species.

Description 
Dryornis represents the largest known cathartiform. Analysis of the known fossil materials suggests that it had a body mass of 26 kg, 57% greater than Vultur grypus (Andean condor) and 94% greater than Cathartes aura (turkey vulture). Several giant genera of extinct birds are known, with some birds like the pseudo toothed Pelagornis at 16-29 kg and the giant teratorn being the largest known bird at 70-80 kg. Dryornis is also distinguished from other cathartids in its skeletal anatomy. The sternum is much more pneumatized than that of other cathartids, likely an adaptation for its size and flight capabilities.  

Dryornis would have been a scavenger, and the only such predator in its ecosystem.

Classification 
In their phylogenetic analyses, Degrange et al. (2021) recovered Dryornis as a member of the Cathartidae and sister taxon to Coragyps+Cathartes. It was more closely related to vultures then to condors.

References 

Cathartidae
Prehistoric bird genera
Santacrucian
Piacenzian life
Miocene birds of South America
Pliocene birds of South America
Fossil taxa described in 1891
Neogene Argentina
Birds described in 1891